This is a list of genealogy databases and online resources that are not specifically restricted to a particular place, family set, or time period in their content.

List for general purposes

Comparison of notable databases for uploading family trees
Some of these also have social networking features.

See also

 Family History Research Wiki, handbook reference information and educational articles showing how to find ancestors

References